Adolphe Borchard (1882–1967) was a French pianist and composer who worked on a number of film scores during the 1930s and 1940s including large-budget films such as Ultimatum (1938). He has several music students. The Vietnamese composer Nguyễn Văn Quỳ is one of them and studied through distance education between 1953 and 1954.

Selected filmography
 The Red Robe (1933)
 The Invisible Woman (1933)
 Prince Jean (1934)
 Confessions of a Cheat (1936)
 Désiré (1937)
 Quadrille (1938)
 Ultimatum (1938)
 Kreutzer Sonata (1938)
 Nine Bachelors (1939)
 Tornavara (1943)
 Jeannou (1943)

References

Bibliography
 Jung, Uli & Schatzberg, Walter. Beyond Caligari: The Films of Robert Wiene. Berghahn Books, 1999.
 Nichols, Roger. The Harlequin Years: Music in Paris, 1917 - 1929. University of California Press, 2002.

External links

1882 births
1967 deaths
Musicians from Le Havre
French film score composers
French male film score composers
20th-century French musicians
20th-century French male musicians